The Norwegian Shipowners Association is an employers' organization and interest group for Norwegian shipping and offshore companies. The organization's primary fields are national and international industry policies, employer issues, competence and recruitment, environmental issues and innovation in addition to safety at sea.

The operations of the Norwegian Shipowners Association is executed in close relation to the industry. The organization is led by boards and councils appointed  by its members, and an important part of the operations is carried out by groups and committees. The member organizations are divided into five different groups: Deep Sea, Short Sea, Group of Underwater entrepreneurs (GUE), Group of Offshore entrepreneurs (GOE) and Group of Offshore Service companies (GOS).

The environmental vision of the Norwegian Shipowners Association is that Norwegian shipping and offshore entrepreneur operations will not have any environmentally damaging emissions at sea or in the air. One of the associations objectives is that climate emissions from shipping will be regulated through international regulations, preferably administrated by IMO.

As an employer organization the Norwegian Shipowners Association is responsible for collective bargaining and the establishment of collective agreements for Norwegian and foreign seamen on a ship in the Norwegian International Ship Register (NIS) and the Norwegian Ship Register (NOR), and for offshore activities. The association protects the members' employer relationship also through the contact and the influence of Norwegian and foreign authorities, and participate in international organizations like the EU, ILO and IMO.

Besides working with the Norwegian maritime schools, it also operate several international activities to ensure access and quality of foreign crew and officers serving on Norwegian-controlled ships. All potential recruitment countries are considered, and the main countries today is the Philippines, China and Russia. Here, the Norwegian Shipowners Association have activities in different degrees.

Norwegian Shipowners' Association has approximately 160 members. The organization is located in Rådhusgaten 25 in Oslo. Harald Solberg is the managing director and Synnøve Seglem is the president.

The organization was founded on 15 September 1909 in Kristiania, under the nameThe Norwegian Shipowner Association, and changed to its current name in 1984. Association's first president was Christian Michelsen. The organization played an important role in the negotiation of shipping contracts with the United Kingdom in World War and World War II and several of the association's members were driving force in the organization of the Nortraship.

Presidents 

 1909–1912: Christian Michelsen
 1913–1915: Aanon Gunerius Knudsen 
 1915–1918: Ambortius Olsen Lindvig
 1921–1924: Gustav Henriksen
 1925–1927: H. Westfal-Larsen
 1928–1930: H.M. Wrangell
 1931–1933: Arth. H. Mathiesen
 1934–1936: Fr. Odfjell
 1937–1940: Christian Wegner Haaland
 1940–1942: Arne Bjørn-Hansen
 ...
 1945–1947: Klaus Wiese-Hansen
 1948–1950: Ths. S. Falck jr.
 1951–1953: Ole Bergesen
 1954–1956: L. Usterud-Svendsen
 1957–1959: H. Kuhnle
 1960–1961: Jørgen Jahre 
 1962–1963: Nils Astrup
 1964–1965: Marius Lundegaard
 1966–1967: Knut H. Staubo
 1968–1969: Johan Horn
 1970–1971: Thomas Chr. Haaland
 1972–1973: Dag Klaveness
 1974–1975: Halfdan Ditlev-Simonsen jr.
 1976–1977: Charles R. Bergesen
 1978–1979: Nils Werring jr. 
 1980–1981: Fridtjof Lorentzen 
 1982–1983: Atle Jebsen 
 1984–1985:  Wollert Hvide
 1986–1987: Peter T. Smedvig 
 1988–1989: Nils Jørgen Astrup 
 1990–1992: Jens Ulltveit-Moe
 1992–1994: Rolf Westfal-Larsen
 1994–1996: Westye Høegh
 1996–1998: Per Sævik 
 1998–2000: Bjørn Sjaastad
 2000–2002: Leif Terje Løddesøl
 2002–2004: Terje J. K. Andersen
 2004–2006: Johan G. Hvide
 2006–2008: Trygve Seglem
 2008–2010: Elisabeth Grieg
 2010–2012: Thor Jørgen Guttormsen
 2012–2014: Trond Kleivdal
 2014-2016: Lars Peder Solstad
 2016-2018: Hans Olav Lindal
 2018 - 2020:Lasse Kristoffersen
 2020-2022: Paul Christian Rieber
2022 - : Synnøve Seglem

References

External links 
 About Norwegian Shipowners' Association (homepage)

Shipping trade associations
Employers' organisations in Norway
Organizations established in 1909
1909 establishments in Norway
Organisations based in Oslo